John McGlynn (born 19 December 1961) is a Scottish football coach and former player who manages Scottish League One club Falkirk. He has previously managed Scottish clubs Raith Rovers, Heart of Midlothian and Livingston.

Playing career 
Musselburgh-born McGlynn enjoyed a brief senior playing career with Berwick Rangers, having been a youth player with Bolton Wanderers. After three years with The Borderers, McGlynn dropped out of the senior game into junior football, firstly with Musselburgh Athletic then Whitehill Welfare.

During his time at Ferguson Park, McGlynn started coaching youth sides and gradually coaching rather than playing became his primary function.

Coaching and managerial career

Early career
McGlynn was appointed co-manager at Easthouses Lily before returning to Musselburgh as manager in his own right.

Hearts (coach)
In 1996, McGlynn was invited to assist with coaching the youth sides at Heart of Midlothian by newly appointed manager Jim Jefferies, initially on a part-time basis. Within two years he had earned a permanent position, eventually working his way up to the position of first-team coach. He was the manager when Hearts won the Scottish Youth Cup in 2000 with a 5–3 win over Rangers.

He was twice appointed manager on a caretaker basis in 2005, after the departures of John Robertson and George Burley.

Raith Rovers
McGlynn ended his ten-year association with Hearts when he was appointed Raith Rovers manager on 20 November 2006. Rovers' second season in the Scottish Second Division ended in disappointment, finishing third and beaten in the promotion play-off semi-finals against Stirling Albion. In 2007–08, McGlynn's first full season, Raith again finished third and fell at the first play-off hurdle, losing to Airdrie United. In 2008–09, however, McGlynn guided Raith to the Second Division title and subsequent promotion back to the First Division.

McGlynn won his first manager of the month award as a Division One manager in March 2010. McGlynn led Raith to a comfortable seventh place and took the club into their first Scottish Cup semi-final for 47 years, beating Peterhead, Airdrie, Aberdeen and Dundee. Raith were eliminated by eventual Cup winners Dundee United.

McGlynn then led Raith to a First Division championship challenge in 2010–11. Despite losing out to Fife derby rivals Dunfermline Athletic in the final weeks of the season, McGlynn won the PFA Scotland Manager of the Year award. In the 2011–12 season, however, Raith struggled against relegation from the First Division.

Hearts (manager)
McGlynn was appointed manager of Hearts on 26 June 2012. With the restricted budget imposed by the club's financial situation he was only able to bring in two new signings and he put his faith in many young players coming through the youth ranks.

Hearts started the SPL season badly under McGlynn, with only one win in the first six games, and lost in the Europa League play-off against Liverpool 2–1 on aggregate, drawing at Anfield. In the League Cup they defeated Livingston and Dundee United to reach the semi-final, but they lost 1–0 to city rivals Hibernian in the fourth round of the Scottish Cup.

Hearts progressed to the 2013 League Cup Final, but poor league results led to McGlynn departing by mutual consent on 28 February 2013.

Livingston
On 12 September 2013, McGlynn was appointed manager of Livingston, replacing the departing Richie Burke. He was initially given a contract until the end of the 2013–14 season. After overseeing good results that improved Livingston's league position, McGlynn agreed an extended rolling contract with the club. McGlynn left Livingston by mutual consent in December 2014.

Celtic (scout)
Celtic hired McGlynn as a first team scout in January 2015, under the management of Ronny Deila. He continued in this position after the appointment of Brendan Rodgers as Celtic manager in 2016.

Raith Rovers (second spell)
McGlynn returned to Raith Rovers, now in the Scottish Championship, in September 2018. He left the club at the end of the 2021–22 season.

Falkirk
A day after leaving Raith, McGlynn was appointed manager of Scottish League One club Falkirk.

Managerial statistics

 SPFL clubs only (Caretaker spells not included)

Honours

As a manager 
Raith Rovers
Scottish Second Division: 2008–09
Fife Cup: 2011–12
Scottish League One: 2019–20
Scottish Challenge Cup: 2019–20 2021–22

As an individual 
 Raith Rovers Hall of Fame

Notes

References 

1961 births
Association football midfielders
Berwick Rangers F.C. players
Bolton Wanderers F.C. players
Falkirk F.C. managers
Heart of Midlothian F.C. managers
Heart of Midlothian F.C. non-playing staff
Living people
Livingston F.C. managers
Musselburgh Athletic F.C. players
People educated at Musselburgh Grammar School
Sportspeople from Musselburgh
Raith Rovers F.C. managers
Scottish Professional Football League managers
Scottish Football League managers
Scottish Football League players
Scottish football managers
Scottish footballers
Scottish Junior Football Association players
Scottish Premier League managers
Celtic F.C. non-playing staff
Footballers from East Lothian